Santa Anna is a census-designated place (CDP) in Starr County, Texas, United States. This was a new CDP for the 2010 census with a population of 13.

Geography
Santa Anna is located at  (26.669238, -98.557884).

Education
It is in the San Isidro Independent School District.

References

Census-designated places in Starr County, Texas
Census-designated places in Texas